This is a list of members of the 51st Legislative Assembly of Queensland from 2004 to 2006, as elected at the 2004 state election held on 7 February 2004.

 On 21 July 2005, the Labor member for Redcliffe, Ray Hollis, resigned. Liberal candidate Terry Rogers won the resulting by-election on 20 August 2005.
 On 25 July 2005, the Labor member for Chatsworth and former Deputy Premier, Terry Mackenroth, resigned. Liberal candidate Michael Caltabiano won the resulting by-election on 20 August 2005.
 On 28 February 2006, the Labor member for Gaven, Robert Poole, resigned. National Party candidate Dr Alex Douglas won the resulting by-election on 1 April 2006.
 The member for Noosa, Cate Molloy, left the Labor Party on 20 August 2006 after losing preselection to recontest her seat at the 2006 election. She served out the final month of her term as an independent.

See also
2004 Queensland state election
Beattie Ministry (Labor) (1998–2007)

References

Members of Queensland parliaments by term
21st-century Australian politicians